KQHE (92.7 FM) is a radio station licensed to serve the Fairbanks, Alaska area, including Fairbanks, North Pole, and Nenana. The station is owned by Little Flower Ministries and airs a Catholic religious format, using a mixture of locally produced programming and content from EWTN Radio.

The station was assigned the call sign KCUF by the Federal Communications Commission on August 24, 2012. The station changed its call sign to KQHE on August 29, 2012. KQHE began broadcasting on August 22, 2013.

References

External links
 Official Website
 

Radio stations established in 2014
2014 establishments in Alaska
Radio stations in Fairbanks, Alaska
QHE
Catholic Church in Alaska
Catholic radio stations